ANN may refer to:

Media
 All Night Nippon, Japan
 All-Nippon News Network, Japan
 Arab News Network, exile Syrian
 Asia News Network, Asia
 Asianet News, India
 Anime News Network, online
 Adventist News Network, online

Transportation
 Annan railway station, from its National Rail code
 Annette Island Airport, Alaska, United States, from its IATA airport code

Computing
 Announcement (computing)
 Artificial neural network

Other
 Academy of Neonatal Nursing, US professional organization
 New Nation Alternative (Alternativa Nueva Nación), a former political coalition in Guatemala
  Ann Inc., US retail group, also with stock ticker symbol ANN

See also
 Ann (disambiguation)